Novopazarska banja is a spa-village situated in Novi Pazar municipality in Serbia.

References

Populated places in Raška District